Lejos de casa: éxodo venezolano (English: Far from Home: Venezuelan Exodus) is a 2020 Venezuelan drama film directed by Abner Ramirez. The film is about the Venezuelan diaspora during the crisis in Venezuela, including the young people that leave the country looking for a better future.

Plot 
Samuel is a young Venezuelan who takes a bus to Chile, emigrating there to find the stability he cannot in his own country. Upon reaching Santiago de Chile, Samuel realizes that emigrating bears several obstacles that he has to deal with to achieve his goal.

Production 
The film's director, Abner Ramírez, has expressed that he has always wanted to make a film about his life because, despite suffering many hardships, he managed to overcome them and succeeded, and that he wanted to inspire the Venezuelans who leave their country seeking a better life. The film began production in Santiago de Chile, being funded independently. Before the release of the film, Ramírez sought out collaborations and ideas to finish the production, hoping to release the film as soon as possible and screen it in Latin American movie theaters.

Cast
 Gabriel Buitrago
 Abner Official
 Yroski Palacios
 Gretchell Loaiza 
 Angibell Nichols
 Darwing Gonzalez

References

External links 
 

2020 films
2020 drama films
2020s Spanish-language films
Films set in Chile
Venezuelan drama films
2020s English-language films